Sacco is a town and comune in the province of Salerno in the Campania region of south-western Italy. As of 2011, its population was 582.

Geography
Located in the central-eastern area of Cilento and near the Alburni mountain range, the municipality borders with Corleto Monforte, Laurino, Piaggine, Roscigno and Teggiano. It has no hamlets (frazioni). The town is located near the spring of the river Sammaro.

Demographics

See also
Cilentan language
Cilento and Vallo di Diano National Park

References

External links

 Sacco official website

Cities and towns in Campania
Localities of Cilento